Ismaila is an old village in Rohtak district, Haryana, India.

Politics
There are two panchayats in the village, 9-B And 11-B. It is an Adrash village in the RTK District and Sitatude at National Highway No. 9 near Sampla On Delhi Rohtak Haryana.

Facilities
The villages facilities include railway station and a big stadium, five government schools (three are primary and two are high schools), two Nahar water supplies for farms and drinking water pipe line in every house, S.B.I and Andhra Banks, and animal hospital. Government Civil Hospital is near Chatru School and Surte School.

Sports
There have been two international Boxers in Ismaila Village, sanbeer Khatri and Vikas Khatri. Both of them had Taken Boxing Training from their own Village in the year 2005. both Sanbeer Khatri and Vikas klHatri Student of Boxing coach Anil Dhankhar. Sanbeer Khatri Has Completed Boxing Coaching Diploma From Patiala2018-19.

Nearby villages
Dattaur - 3 km from Sampla, Rohtak
Gijhi
Gandhra
Atayal
Sampla
Chuliana
Kultana
Barhana

Villages in Rohtak district